Achampalli may refer to:

Achampalli (Mulbagal), village in Karnataka, India
Achampalli (Srinivaspur), village in Karnataka, India